Calophyllum acidus is a species of flowering plant in the family Calophyllaceae. It is found only in southern central and southwestern Sri Lanka.

References

Bibliography

acidus
Plants described in 1982
Taxa named by André Joseph Guillaume Henri Kostermans